Máirín Nic Eoin, Irish academic and scholar.

Currently, Cregan Professor of Irish St Patrick's College / DCU, Nic Eoin was elected to the Royal Irish Academy in 2016. In 2003 she and Brian Lalor were consultant editors for Literature in Irish in The Encyclopaedia of Ireland. In 2022 she was made an honorary fellow of Trinity College.

Her work has been published by An Clóchomhar and Cló Iar-Chonnacht.

Selected bibliography

Articles

 "Prose Writing in Irish Today", pp. 131–139, A New View of the Irish Language, eds. Caoilfhionn Nic Pháidín and Seán Ó Cearnaigh, Cois Life, Dublin, 2008.

Books

 An Litríocht Réigiúnach, An Clóchomhar, 1982.
 Eoghan Ó Tuairisc: Beatha agus Saothar, An Clóchomhar, 1988.
 An Ghaeilge i gCill Chainnigh, Comhar naMúinteoirí Gaeilge, 1993.
 B’Ait LeoBean: Gnéithe den Idé-eolaíocht Inscne i dTraidisiún Liteartha na Gaeilge, An Clóchomhar, 1998
 Ar an gCoigríoch, Cló Iar-Chonnacht
 Ó Theagasc Teanga go Sealbhú Teanga: Múineadh agus Foghlaim na Gaeilge ar an Tríú Leibhéal(with Ríona Ní Fhrighil), Cois Life, 2009.
 Gaolta Gairide, Cois Life, 2010, 
 Trén bhFearann Breac, Cois Life, 2013

References

External links
 https://www.dcu.ie/fiontar/gaeilge/people/mairin-nic-eoin.shtml
 https://www.ria.ie/mairin-nic-eoin
 https://breac.nd.edu/articles/38920-interdisciplinary-perspectives-on-transnational-irish-language-writing-2/

21st-century Irish women writers
Academics of Dublin City University
Honorary Fellows of Trinity College Dublin
Irish-language writers
Living people
Linguists from Ireland
Members of the Royal Irish Academy
Year of birth missing (living people)